Mike Obrovac (October 11, 1955 – March 20, 2018) was an American football tackle and guard. He played for the Toronto Argonauts from 1979 to 1980 and for the Cincinnati Bengals from 1981 to 1983.

He died on March 20, 2018, at age 62.

References

1955 births
2018 deaths
American football offensive tackles
American football offensive guards
Bowling Green Falcons football players
Toronto Argonauts players
Cincinnati Bengals players